Antoine Dalla Cieca (15 November 1931 – 27 January 2022) was a French football player and manager who played as a midfielder.

Biography
As a young footballer, Cieca played in his hometown of Champigny-sur-Marne. From 1953 to 1958, he played for RC Paris. He then played for Olympique Lyonnais from 1958 to 1960, where he scored 12 goals and played in the 1958–60 Inter-Cities Fairs Cup. He played for FC Rouen from 1960 to 1963 before playing a season with Angers SCO. In total, he played in 395 games and scored 88 goals.

Cieca remained coach of VS Chartres until 1969, when he began managing . He ended his coaching career in 1981 with Red Star F.C. after the team was relegated to Division 4.

He died on 27 January 2022, at the age of 90.

References

1931 births
2022 deaths
People from Champigny-sur-Marne
French footballers
Racing Club de France Football players
Olympique Lyonnais players
FC Rouen players
Angers SCO players
Red Star F.C. players
French football managers
Paris FC managers
Red Star F.C. managers
Association footballers not categorized by position